Olav Moen (19 October 1909 - 5 June 1995) was a Norwegian politician for the Liberal Party.

He served as a deputy representative to the Norwegian Parliament from Oppland during the term
1973–1977.

References

1909 births
1995 deaths
Liberal Party (Norway) politicians
Deputy members of the Storting